Belize Adventist Junior College is a Christian Junior college in the Calcutta Village of the Corozal District in Belize. The Belize Adventist Junior College provides students with an education in a Christian setting.

It is a part of the Seventh-day Adventist education system, the world's second largest Christian school system.

Spiritual aspects
Students take religion classes each year that they are enrolled. The classes cover topics in biblical history and Christian and denominational doctrines. Instructors in other disciplines also begin each class period with prayer or a short devotional thought, many with student input. Weekly, the entire student body gathers together for an hour-long chapel service. Outside the classrooms there is year-round spiritually oriented programming that relies on student involvement.

Athletics
The Sydney Adventist College offer the following  sports:
Soccer (boys and girls)

See also

 List of Seventh-day Adventist secondary schools
 Seventh-day Adventist education
 Seventh-day Adventist Church
 Seventh-day Adventist theology
 History of the Seventh-day Adventist Church

References

Schools in Belize
Secondary schools affiliated with the Seventh-day Adventist Church
Corozal
Educational institutions established in 1999
1999 establishments in Belize